Lovemore Tatenda Gumunyu Manatsa (born 17 May 1990) is a Zimbabwean cricketer.

He made his first-class debut for Northerns in 2008/09 season. Tatenda later went on to play for Mashonaland Eagles in first-class cricket, List A cricket and T20 cricket. He made into the Zimbabwe A team for the series against Afghanistan in 2014.

References

External links 
 

1990 births
Living people
Zimbabwean cricketers
Mashonaland Eagles cricketers
Sportspeople from Harare